Wales & West Utilities operates the gas distribution network across Wales and South West England in the United Kingdom. It also provides the gas emergency service and delivers the iron mains risk reduction programme in those areas.

History
The company was set up following National Grid plc's decision to sell four of its local gas distribution networks in order to raise funds for expansion.

The Wales & West Utilities consortium, led by the Macquarie European Infrastructure Fund, made a successful bid for the area, and began operations on 1 June 2005. It moved to its current headquarters at Celtic Springs Business Park, Newport, in June 2006.  It operates around 35,000 km of gas pipelines with an estimated population of 7.5 million. In 2012, the company was sold to several companies controlled by Li Ka Shing.

The company has operational bases in Wrexham, Flint, Colwyn Bay, Haverfordwest, Swansea, Cardiff, Newport, Evesham, Swindon, Bristol, Bath, Trowbridge, Bridgwater, Exeter, Bideford, Torquay, Plymouth and Redruth.

References

External links
 
 Map of UK Gas Distribution Networks (GDNs)

Energy companies established in 2005
Companies based in Newport, Wales
Utilities of the United Kingdom
Natural gas companies of the United Kingdom
Natural gas pipeline companies
British companies established in 2005